Universal Lighting Technologies, Inc. is a commercial lighting manufacturer  founded in 1947 and based in Nashville, Tennessee. It was part of the $105 Billion Panasonic family of companies from 2007 to 2021. Together, Universal Lighting Technologies and Douglas Lighting Controls are entities under the parent company Universal Douglas Lighting Americas, Inc. (UDLA). Today, the company is owned by Atar Capital and operates under the entity of Universal Douglas Lighting Americas, Inc.

UDLA primarily designs and manufactures light emitting diode (LED) products, including LED Drivers, LED Modules, LED Luminaires, LED Retrofit Kits, LED Tubes, and Ballasts. They also provide lighting control components and control systems, including stand-alone wireless control, sensors, switches, and digital and analog dimming systems. The company acquired Vossloh-Schwabe's North American operations in 2009. This allowed them to also offer a full range of HID products, ignitors, transformers, lampholders, capacitors, and other components.

Universal Lighting Technologies has over 150 patents and offers LED Components. Universal Lighting Technologies has kept all of their operating facilities in North America and uses 12 distribution warehouses to distribute products.

Company History and Timeline

Timeline

1943: Triad-Utrad was founded in 1943, and, with the installation of electronic DC ballasts in the mass transit industry, was the first in the industry to introduce the electronic ballast, continuing on with later introductions of ballasts for T12, T8, and compact fluorescent lamps.

1947: Universal Lighting Technologies began in 1947 when two lighting industry corporations – Universal Manufacturing Company and Triad-Utrad Energy Savings Incorporated merged. Universal Manufacturing Company was one of the first companies to manufacture lighting ballasts, and Triad-Utrad was the first company to introduce the electronic lighting ballast.

1960's: Introduced a line of Electronic Ballasts 

1970's: Expanded to Magnetic HID Ballasts 

1980's: Produced T12 electronic products & instant start T8 ballasts 

1990's: Introduced first ballast offering five voltages; Created ballasts that offered universal input voltage.

2000's: Began offering LED Driver and Module components; Created the High Efficiency Programmed Start Ballast 

2007: Introduced the Signa LED Systems 

2009: The manufacturing facility receives “Clean Industry” certification.

2009: Acquired Vossloh-Schwabe's North American operations.

2011: Universal works with Boeing to cut their energy use by 57%.

2015: Designed and released the EVERLINE Replacement Drivers.

2015: Released the EVERLINE LED Retrofit line offering good-better-best retrofit products so that customers would have a variety of options and price points for their LED Retrofit projects.

2016: Universal adds T8 LED Linear Tubes to their EVERLINE product line.

2017: Universal adds the Professional Retrofit Kit to the EVERLINE LED Retrofit line

2018: Universal releases Emergency LED Drivers.

2018: Created PW series Drivers with technology that allows users to tune their LED drivers from their mobile phones.

2019: Universal adds LED Round High Bay, LRK34, and PWX LED Drivers  with controllable outdoor luminaire applications.

2020: Universal Introduces Complete, Stand-Alone Bluetooth Wireless Control Solutions.

2020: Universal Announces New Website.

2021: Two entities (Douglas + Universal) merged into one company (Universal Douglas Lighting Americas, Inc.)

Universal Lighting Today
Atar Capital is the current owner via acquisition. Prior to March 2021, Panasonic Lighting Americas, Inc. (PLTA) was the parent of Universal Lighting Technologies, Inc. and Douglas Lighting Controls, Inc. The company markets its LED upgrades, LED components, and IoT-enabled lighting control systems. Universal Lighting's product brands are under the Universal, EVERLINE, Triad, and Signa brand names. A key strategy of theirs continues to be research and product development, with R&D facility in Huntsville, AL.

References 

Lighting brands
Panasonic
Manufacturing companies based in Nashville, Tennessee